The 1990 Missouri Tigers football team represented the University of Missouri in the 1990 NCAA Division I-A football season. The Tigers offense scored 278 points while the defense allowed 360 points. Led by head coach Bob Stull, the Tigers finished the season unranked.

Schedule

Fifth Down Game

    
    
    
    
    
    
    
    
    
    
    

The Fifth Down Game is the name of a college football game that included a play that the crew officiating the game permitted to occur in error. That play enabled the Colorado Buffaloes to defeat the Missouri Tigers by scoring a touchdown on the last play of their game on October 6, 1990. The ensuing controversy cast doubt on Colorado's claim to NCAA Division I-A's 1990 national championship. It has been called one of the top memorable moments and blunders in college football history.

Roster

1991 NFL Draft

References

Missouri
Missouri Tigers football seasons
Missouri Tigers football